Marquess of Almenara is a hereditary title in the Peerage of Spain, granted in 1587 by Philip II to Iñigo López de Mendoza, his representative in the Kingdom of Aragon.

Iñigo López de Mendoza went to trial with his first cousin, the Princess of Éboli, to claim the Lordship of Puebla de Almenara, founded by their great-grandfather, Cardinal Mendoza, who had established that it could only be inherited through the male line. He subsequently won the lawsuit, becoming Lord of Almenara and in 1587, he became the 1st Marquess of Almenara by the wishes of the king.

In 1623, Philip IV granted another title with the same name, yet making reference to a completely different location near Peñaflor, in the Province of Seville. This subsequent title is sometimes referred to as "Marquess of Dehesa de Almenara" to distinguish it from the older title, despite the official name being the same.

Marquesses of Almenara (1587)

Iñigo López de Mendoza y Manrique de Luna, 1st Marquess of Almenara
Diego López de Mendoza y Manrique de Luna, 2nd Marquess of Almenara
Diego de Mendoza y de la Cerda, 3rd Marquess of Almenara
Ruy Gómez de Silva y Mendoza, 4th Marquess of Almenara
Rodrigo Díaz de Vivar y de Silva, 5th Marquess of Almenara
Gregorio María de Silva y Mendoza, 6th Marquess of Almenara
Juan de Dios de Silva y Haro, 7th Marquess of Almenara
María Teresa de Silva y Gutiérrez de los Ríos, 8th Marchioness of Almenara
Pedro de Alcántara Álvarez de Toledo y Silva, 9th Marquess of Almenara
María de los Dolores Leopoldina Álvarez de Toledo y Salm-Salm, 10th Marchioness of Almenara
María Francisca Beaufort Spontin y Álvarez de Toledo, 11th Marchioness of Almenara 
Pedro de Alcántara Téllez-Girón y Beaufort Spontin, 12th Marquess of Almenara
Mariano Téllez-Girón y Beaufort Spontin, 13th Marquess of Almenara 
María Teresa de Arteaga y Echagüe, 14th Marchioness of Almenara
José Álvarez de las Asturias-Bohórquez y Arteaga, 15th Marquess of Almenara
Jaime Álvarez de las Asturias-Bohórquez y Silva, 16th Marquess of Almenara
María del Pilar Álvarez de las Asturias-Bohórquez y Silva, 17th Marchioness of Almenara

See also
Spanish nobility
House of Beaufort-Spontin

References

Bibliography
 

Marquesses of Spain
Lists of Spanish nobility
Noble titles created in 1587